Marlon Antonio Fernández Jiménez (born 16 January 1986 in San Cristóbal) is a Venezuelan footballer who currently plays as a midfielder for Deportivo Táchira. In 2009, he was capped two times for the Venezuela national team.

Career

Deportivo Táchira
Fernández began his career playing for Deportivo Táchira. In 2004, he was included in the Deportivo first-team squad. During his six years at Estadio Polideportivo de Pueblo Nuevo, he scored 12 goals in 151 matches. Marlon won the 2008 Venezuela League trophy with Deportivo.

On 17 April 2009, Fernández scored his first-ever Copa Libertadores goal, netting Deportivo's second in a 2–1 victory over the Paraguayan side Club Guaraní.

ACD Lara
In 2010 Fernández signed for ACD Lara. He made his debut on 8 August in a 1–0 home defeat against Zulia, coming on as a substitute for Pedro de Pablos. Ten days later, he assisted Aquiles Ocanto and Edwin Chalar in a 2–0 home win over Santa Fe in their 2010 Copa Sudamericana preliminary stage first leg tie. On 24 September, Fernández scored his first goal for ACD Lara in a 2–2 draw against Zamora. Marlon netted Lara's only goal in a 2–1 defeat at Deportivo Anzoátegui on 13 February 2011.

Cherno More (loan)
On 3 January 2012, Cherno More Varna confirmed Fernández has joined on loan until the end of the season. He made his league debut on 4 March, in a 2–1 defeat to Levski Sofia. On 17 March, Marlon scored his first competitive goal for the club, scoring the match's only goal against Minyor Pernik.

References

1986 births
Living people
Association football midfielders
Venezuelan footballers
Venezuela international footballers
Deportivo Táchira F.C. players
Asociación Civil Deportivo Lara players
PFC Cherno More Varna players
C.D. Antofagasta footballers
Deportivo Pasto footballers
Atlético Venezuela C.F. players
Chilean Primera División players
First Professional Football League (Bulgaria) players
Categoría Primera A players
Venezuelan expatriate footballers
Expatriate footballers in Chile
Venezuelan expatriate sportspeople in Chile
Expatriate footballers in Bulgaria
Venezuelan expatriate sportspeople in Bulgaria
Expatriate footballers in Colombia
People from San Cristóbal, Táchira
20th-century Venezuelan people
21st-century Venezuelan people